True West Magazine (alternate title: True West) is an American magazine that covers the icons like Wyatt Earp, Doc Holliday, Billy the Kid, and Jesse James and relates American Old West history back to the present day to show the role contemporary Western heritage plays in keeping the spirit of the Old West alive today.

Started in 1953, True West is headquartered in Cave Creek, Arizona, and publishes monthly. It is the world's oldest, continuously published Western American magazine.

True West observed its 65th anniversary in 2018, having offered past coverage in Blasts from the Past, beginning in its January 2013 issue.

History
True West began publication in 1953 under founder Joe Small of Austin, Texas. The idea for True West originated from a monthly feature in Small's first publication, Sporting Magazine. The magazine's recurring "Bad Man" article, about outlaws of the West, was the feature that generated the most reader mail and interest. True West was born to satisfy the readers' hunger for Old West history.

True West was the largest Western magazine on the market in the 1960s, selling hundreds of thousands of copies monthly at newsstands. The magazine benefited from an era featuring popular television western series such as Bonanza, The Lone Ranger, and Gunsmoke. At least one episode, "The Hunted" (1958), of the ABC/Warner Brothers series Sugarfoot is based on a True West article. Fans interested in the lives of real cowboys and cowgirls found those stories in True West.

After that, the early era of television westerns faded during the time of the Vietnam War and disco music. In 1979, Small sold the magazine to Chet Krause of Iola, Wisconsin. Small stayed on as publisher, with Krause as assistant publisher. The magazine saw a few moves — to Perkins, Oklahoma, then Stillwater — before the 1999 move to Cave Creek, Arizona. Among its new owners was Bob Boze Bell, who first discovered the magazine as a nine-year-old at Desert Drugs in Kingman, Arizona. The publication sparked a lifelong interest in the Old West. As the January 2000 issue was being edited, Bell flew to Stillwater to design the cover because he, "wanted to own the millennium."

Bell felt the magazine needed to change with the times or it would not survive. One of the first changes he made was switching the magazine from pulp paper to gloss, as True West was one of the last remaining publications using pulp. He also expanded the coverage of Western movies, since so many people developed a love of Old West history after being exposed to Westerns on television or the big screen. He added, and still writes, the successful "Classic Gunfights" department that has featured more than one hundred gunfights of the Old West.

In 2007, Ken Amorosano joined the team as associate publisher. In 2011, he became True West's publisher and set the magazine in a new direction, catering the publication more toward its core history aficionados and expanding the magazine's readership globally. To put forth their vision, Bell and Amorosano rely on a quality editorial and production team headed by editor-in-chief Bob Boze Bell, art director Daniel Harshberger, production manager Robert Ray, and general manager Carol Compton Glenn.

The magazine has continued to change with the times. Readers mingle on True West's regularly updated social network feeds: Facebook, Pinterest, YouTube and Twitter.

Departments
True West puts the focus on history with features like "Classic Gunfights" and "Ask the Marshall", featuring Arizona's official state historian Marshall Trimble, who responds to reader inquiries such as, "How prevalent was the stampede string on Old West hats?" Firearms expert Phil Spangenberger features a classic Western firearm each month in "Shooting from the Hip". The magazine also shines the spotlight on today's true Westerners with the departments "What History Has Taught Me" and "'Old West Saviors". Investigating History delves into questions of the past to bring readers answers to long-held mysteries.True West guides readers who still want to experience and live an Old West lifestyle by publishing features such as its hearty food column, "Frontier Fare", and "Evolution of Western Wear", sharing the history behind the clothing and gear worn by Westerners today. "True Western Towns" guides readers to cities where the West is still alive. "Renegade Roads" creates history-inspired travel routes for readers to embark to the West.

Television
Executive editor Bob Boze Bell is regularly featured on True West Moments, which airs on  Encore's Westerns channel. He responds to inquiries from around the world.

In 2012, in honor of Arizona's centennial, True West created and released the show Outrageous Arizona, an irreverent and humorous look at the history of Arizona, hosted by Bob Boze Bell and True West contributors Jana Bommersbach and Marshall Trimble. The show aired on select PBS stations in the Southwest. Outrageous Arizona received an EMMY Award from Rocky Mountain Southwest Chapter of the National Academy of Television Arts and Sciences (NATAS) in 2013.

AwardsTrue West has won multiple silver and bronze All-Industry Marketing (AIM) awards since 2005.

In 2008, the Western Writers of America awarded True West the Lariat Award for outstanding support of the organization and its members.

In June 2010, True West hit Fern Siegel's "Magazine Rack" in Media Post. "The Empire State Building is my true north—as it is for anyone who lives in downtown Manhattan... For those seeking an authentic experience without actual contact, try True West," Siegel wrote, adding: "Today, the popular history pub hopes to 'capture the spirit of the West with authenticity, personality and humor,' linking its past to its present. In the immortal words of Seinfeld's Kramer: 'Giddy-up.'"

The Oregon-California Trails Association awarded True West the Distinguished Service Award in August 2010 in recognition of consistently publishing travel articles on the National Historic Trails.

An Oregon city, The Dalles, recognized True West'' as a top national magazine in January 2011.

References

External links
True West
Bob Boze Bell Blog

History magazines published in the United States
Monthly magazines published in the United States
History of the American West
Magazines established in 1953
Magazines published in Arizona
Magazines published in Oklahoma